São Roque do Canaã is a municipality located in the Brazilian state of Espírito Santo. Its population was 12,510 (2020) and its area is 342 km².  The capital of the municipality is located at an altitude of 120 meters above sea level.

References

Municipalities in Espírito Santo